London New Zealand could refer to:
London New Zealand Cricket Club
London New Zealand RFC